Aldo Berardi, O.SS.T. (born 30 September 1963) is a French Catholic bishop. He is the Vicar Apostolic  of the Apostolic Vicariate of Northern Arabia. On 28 January 2023, Msgr. Berardi was appointed Vicar Apostolic of the Vicariate Apostolic of Northern Arabia. He previously served as the vicar general of the Order of the Most Holy Trinity for the Redemption of Captives.

Life 
Berardi was born in Longeville-lès-Metz, France on September 30, 1963.

In 1979, he entered the Foyer-Séminaire in Montigny-lès-Metz and attended George de la Tour High School in Metz. From 1982 to 1984, he studied Philosophy at the Major Seminary of Villers-lès-Nancy. He then served in his civil service in Madagascar from 1984 to 1986, where he held positions as a French teacher, librarian, and cultural officer.

In 1986, Berardi entered the novitiate of the Trinitarian Order in Cerfoid, France and made his first religious profession in 1987. He then studied Theology at the Major Seminary of Montreal from 1987 to 1990, and made his perpetual profession in Rome, Italy in December 1990. He was ordained a priest in Ars-sur-Moselle, France on July 20, 1991.

From 1990 to 1992, Berardi attended the Accademia Alfonsiana in Rome and obtained a Licentiate in Moral Theology. During this time, he also served at Caritas Rome. He then served as director of a Spirituality Centre in Cerfoid from 1992 to 1998, and held various positions such as parochial vicar, school chaplain, chaplain of a psychiatric hospital, Boy Scout assistant, and Catholic Action assistant.

From 2000 to 2006, Berardi directed the Centre Sainte Bakhita in Cairo, which sheltered Sudanese refugees. He served in the Sacred Heart Parish in Manama, Bahrain from 2007 to 2010 and was Provincial Counsellor for his Congregation from 2009 to 2012. From 2011 to 2019, he returned to the Apostolic Vicariate of Northern Arabia, serving as Parish Priest and Episcopal Vicar.

From 2019 to 2023, Berardi served as Vicar General of the Order of the Holy Trinity for the Redemption of Captives, President of the General Secretariat of Formation, and Legal Representative of the Congregation’s Generalate. On January 28, 2023, Pope Francis appointed Berardi as the new Apostolic Vicar of the Apostolic Vicariate of Northern Arabia, succeeding Camillo Ballin, MCCJ, who died on April 12, 2020. 

He was ordained on 18 March 2023 at Our Lady of Arabia Cathedral, Bahrain by Cardinal Miguel Angel Ayuso Guixot, Prefect of the dicastery for Interreligious Dialogue.

See also 

 First message
 Episcopal ordination

References 

1963 births

Living people
Bahraini Christians
Catholic Church in Kuwait
Apostolic Vicariate of Northern Arabia
Catholic Church in the Arabian Peninsula
Roman Catholic bishops in the Middle East